Mel Odom may refer to:

Mel Odom (author) (born 1957), author of science-fiction and fantasy novels
Mel Odom (artist) (born 1950), artist and designer of the Gene Marshall fashion doll